Big Brother 10 is the tenth season of various versions of Big Brother and may refer to:

 Big Brother 10 (U.S.), the 2008 edition of the U.S. version
 Gran Hermano Spain (season 10), the 2008-2009 edition of the Spanish version
 Big Brother 10 (UK), the 2009 edition of the UK version
 Grande Fratello (season 10), the 2009–2010 edition of the Italian version
 Big Brother Germany (season 10), the 2010 edition of the German version
 Big Brother Brasil 10, the 2010 edition of the Brazilian version
 Big Brother 10 (Australia), the 2013 edition of Big Brother Australia

See also
 Big Brother (franchise)
 Big Brother (disambiguation)